CSKA Pamir Dushanbe is a professional football club based in Dushanbe, Tajikistan that currently plays in the Tajikistan Higher League, the country's top division. Since 1997, the club has been under the patronage of the Tajik Army, like its former rivals CSKA Dushanbe.

History
Created in 1970 based on FC Energetik Dushanbe, the new Pamir Dushanbe was the only Tajik club to be promoted to the former Soviet Top League, in which the club played for the last three seasons that the league existed just prior to the dissolution of the USSR: 1989, 1990, and 1991. They made the semi-finals of the last Soviet Cup, losing to CSKA Moscow. Due to the ongoing Tajik Civil War, the club was dissolved and its players moved to Uzbekistan. Couple of Dushanbe based clubs were removed from the Tajik League after 1996.

Originally, at least since the World War II in Stalinabad (Soviet name for Dushanbe) existed FC Dinamo Stalinabad which in 1950 carried the name of Bolshevik. Sometime in 1956 the local football team was taken over by Tajikistani agrarian sports society of Kolhosci and later until 1969 by a sports society of power generation workers, Energetik.

The club formerly played at the Pamir Stadium, but today plays at the smaller CSKA Stadium.

CSKA Pamir
Sometime in 1997 the club was recreated under aegis of the Ministry of Defense of Tajikistan and was transformed into the Tajikistani CSKA club which was coached by newly retired former Pamir footballer Damir Kamaletdinov.

In July 2016, CSKA fired manager Rahmatullo Fuzailov, replacing him with Tokhirjon Muminov.

On 5 January 2019, Rustam Khojayev was appointed as the new manager of CSKA. On 23 June 2019 Khojayev resigned as manager. On 8 July 2019, Sergey Zhitsky was appointed as CSKA's new manager.

Domestic history

Continental history

Honours
USSR Second Division (2): 1988
Ligai Olii Tojikiston (3): 1992, 1995,
Tajik Cup (2): 1992

Statistics

The following are statistics on CSKA Pamir Dushanbe's footballers' performance in USSR Top League between 1988 and 1991.

Most matches in USSR Top League

Most goals in USSR Top League

Current squad
''

Notable players
Players who had international caps for their respective countries.

Tajikistan
 Alier Ashurmamadov
 Arsen Avakov
 Yuri Baturenko
 Igor Cherevchenko
 Khakim Fuzailov
 Rahmatullo Fuzailov
 Shuhrat Mamajonov
 Andrei Manannikov
 Vazgen Manasyan
   Sergey Mandreko

  Mukhsin Mukhamadiev
 Tokhirjon Muminov
 Vasili Postnov
  Rashid Rakhimov
 Valeri Sarychev
  Oleg Shirinbekov
 Georgi Takhokhov
 Anatoli Volovodenko
 Oleksiy Cherednyk
 Edgar Gess

Former USSR countries
 Charyar Mukhadov
 Röwşen Muhadow
 Azamat Abduraimov
 Ravshan Bozorov
 Rustam Zabirov

Africa
 Wisdom Mumba Chansa
 Derby Makinka
 Pearson Mwanza

Managers
 Nikolay Potapov (1964)
 Andrei Zazroyev (1964–66)
 Vladimir Alyakrinskii (1967–68)
 Ivan Vasilevich (1968–69)
 Ahmad Alaskarov (1972)
  Ishtvan Sekech (1973–78)
 Vladimir Gulyamhaydarov (1982–83)
 Yuri Semin (1983–85)
 Sharif Nazarov (1986–88), (1992–??)
 Damir Kamaletdinov (1998–05)
 Makhmadjon Khabibulloev (2012–2015)
 Rahmatullo Fuzailov (2016)
 Tokhirjon Muminov (2016)
 Abdugaffor Yuldashev (2017)
 Rustam Khojayev (2018–2019)
 Sergey Zhitsky (2019–2021)
 Amin Sobhani (2022–)

References

 http://fft.tj/index.php?limitstart=3

External links
Official club website
Club statistics on KLISF

Football clubs in Tajikistan
Football clubs in Dushanbe
Soviet Top League clubs
Pamir Dushanbe